Château de Rochemorin is Bordeaux wine producer from the Pessac-Léognan appellation of Bordeaux. The château is located in the commune of Martillac. Château de Rochemorin is owned by André Lurton since 1973.

External links
Château de Rochemorin official site

Bordeaux wine producers
Châteaux in Gironde
Monuments historiques of Gironde